Pontllanfraith Low Level railway station served the village of Pontllanfraith, historically in Monmouthshire, Wales, from 1857 to 1964 on the Newport, Abergavenny and Hereford Railway.

History 
The station was opened as Tredegar Junction on 25 May 1857 by the Newport, Abergavenny and Hereford Railway. An excursion ran on 1 June 1857, which carried 15000 people and travelled to South Wales. Its name was changed to Pontllanfraith on 1 May 1905 and changed again to Pontllanfraith Low Level on 19 July 1950. It closed on 15 June 1964.

References 

Railway stations in Great Britain opened in 1857
Railway stations in Great Britain closed in 1964
1857 establishments in Wales
1964 disestablishments in Wales